North Tampa is a neighborhood within the city limits of Tampa, Florida. As of the 2010 census the neighborhood had a population of 5,585. The ZIP Codes neighborhood are 33604 and 33612.

Geography
North Tampa boundaries are University to the north, Nebraska Avenue to the west, Sulphur Springs to the south, and University Square (neighborhood) to the east.

Demographics
Source: Hillsborough County Atlas

As of the census of 2010, there were 5,585 people and 2,174 households residing in the neighborhood. The population density was  6,974/mi2. The racial makeup of the neighborhood was 39%  White, 50% African American, less than 1% Native American, 1% Asian, 7% from other races, and 4% from two or more races. Hispanic or Latino of any race were 28% of the population.

There were 2,174 households, out of which 28% had children under the age of 18 living with them, 20% were married couples living together, 24% had a female householder with no husband present, and 40% were non-families. 9% of all households were made up of individuals. .

In the neighborhood the population was spread out, with 28% under the age of 18, 26% from 18 to 34, 21% from 35 to 49, 17% from 50 to 64, and 8% who were 65 years of age or older. The median age was 40 years. For every 100 females, there were 110.5 males.

The per capita income for the neighborhood was $10,209. About 35% of the population were below the poverty line, including 46% of those under age 18 and 5% of those age 65 or over.

See also
Neighborhoods in Tampa, Florida

References

External links
North Tampa Civic Association
North Tampa Chamber of Commerce  (serving North Tampa and surrounding areas)

Neighborhoods in Tampa, Florida
Former municipalities in Florida